Joël Godin  (born March 14, 1965) is a Canadian politician, who was elected to the House of Commons of Canada in the 2015 election from the district of Portneuf—Jacques-Cartier.

He is a former municipal councillor in Saint-Joachim, Quebec.

Electoral record

References

1965 births
Living people
21st-century Canadian politicians
Conservative Party of Canada MPs
Members of the House of Commons of Canada from Quebec
People from Capitale-Nationale
Quebec municipal councillors